Blatant Disarray is an American thrash metal band from Raleigh, North Carolina.

History 

Everyone Dies Alone is the debut studio album by Blatant Disarray. It was produced by John Custer, mixed and mastered by Jamie King. It was released  March 16, 2010, through Tribunal Records.

The Harbinger is the second full-length album by the band. It was released  May 13, 2014, through Dirt Records and features a guest appearance by Reed Mullin (Corrosion of Conformity).

Ebon Path is the third studio album by Blatant Disarray. It was released  February 12, 2019, through Dirt Records.

High Time for a War Crime is the fourth studio album by Blatant Disarray.  It was released on December 18, 2020, through Dirt Records.

Members 

Current members
 Mike Schaefer – rhythm guitar, vocals (1999–present)
 Ryan Johnson – lead guitar (1999–present)
 Patrick Strickland – bass (2010–2014, 2017–present)
 Stephen Parson – drums (2015–present)

Former members
 Tim Worrell – drums (2000–2012)
 Adam Peterson – bass (2003–2010)
 Tyler Smith – bass (2014–2017)
 Trey McLamb – drums (2012–2015)
 Tony Chambers – bass (2000–2001)
 Jeff Pertz – bass (2001–2002)
 Alex Furini – bass (2002–2003)
 Nolan Lawing – drums (2011)
 Jeff Maddry – live bass (2000–2005)

Discography 
Everyone Dies Alone (2010)
The Harbinger (2014)
Ebon Path (2018)
High Time for a War Crime (2020)

Other
Blatant Disarray (EP, 2001)

References 

Musical groups from Raleigh, North Carolina